The Kiss Baking Company Limited is the leading Trinidadian firms that makes and markets packaged bakery goods.  The company was founded in 1978.  Kiss also acquired the rival company Coelho Baking Industries in 1989.  It is located in Chaguanas, Trinidad and Tobago.

The products are:
Bread
Wrap-a-daps
Kiss Milk 
Kiss Raisin Bread
Kiss Lemon Bread
Vitaloaf
Kiss Multigrain
Kiss Whole wheat
Hot Dog buns
Hamburger buns  
Healthy Balance Sliced Bread
Whole Wheat Hops Bread
White Hops Bread
Cakes
Snack plain round
Oval goodies
Iced cup cakes
Jelly filled cakes
Corn muffins
•	Brownies
•	Single and Double Donuts.

The flavors of the cakes available are:
Orange
Chocolate
Vanilla
Strawberry

Additionally, the company makes customized cakes for special orders. Products are also exported to the other Caribbean islands, as well. Kiss has over one hundred vehicles distributing bread and cakes across Trinidad and Tobago.  They enjoy a monopoly in Trinidad and Tobago having bought out their only serious competitor as mentioned above.   The Company has also been guilty of inaccurate and misleading labelling of some of its products.
Kiss' new products includes baked goods such as the artisan breads, almond slice cake, banana bread, glazed doughnuts, sweet bread and jelly filled cakes.

References

External links
 Company Info: Business listing

Food and drink companies of Trinidad and Tobago
Brands of Trinidad and Tobago
Bakeries